Joseph-Alphonse Teste, J.-Alphonse Teste  or Alphonse Teste  (France, 1814–1888) was a homeopath, mesmerist, and doctor in France. He wrote several books related to homeopathy and mesmerism.

Works 
 Manuel pratique du magnétisme animal, (Paris: Libraire de l'Académie Royal de Medicine, 1840).
 "Une somnambule médicale". extract from the April issue of Transactions du magnétisme animal (Paris: P. Baudouin 1841).
 A practical manual of animal magnetism: containing an exposition of the methods employed in producing the magnetic phenomena; with its application to the treatment and cure of diseases. (London: H. Bailliere, 1843)
 Le magnétisme animal expliqué, ou, Leçons analytiques sur la nature essentielle du magnétisme, sur ses effets son histoire, ses applications, les diverses manières de la pratiquer, etc with W. Topham. (Paris: Chez J.-B. Baillière, libraire de l'Académie royale de médecine ; London: H. Baillière, 1845).
 A homeopathic treatise on the diseases of children. (Cincinnati, Moore, Anderson, Wilstach & Keys, 1854) English version translated by Emma H. Côté. (Cincinnati, Moore, Anderson, Wilstach & Keys, 1854).
 Traité homoeopathique des maladies aigues et chroniques des enfants, by Dr Alph. Teste. (Paris, J.B. Baillière etc., 1850)
 Systématisation pratique de la matiëre médicale homoeopathique par A. Teste. (Paris, J. -B. Baillière; Lond., H. Baillière etc., 1853).
 Bekenntnisse eines Magnetiseurs. (1855)
 Comment on devient homoeopathe. (1865)

See also 
 History of hypnosis
 The Zoist

References

1888 deaths
1814 births
French homeopaths
Animal magnetism